James Joseph Heath (born 17 March 1983) is an English professional golfer.

Heath was born in London. He started playing golf with his father at the age of ten. Having played in the Faldo Junior Series, he went on to a successful amateur career, highlighted by winning the English Amateur and Lytham Trophy, where he broke the previous scoring record by 10 strokes, in 2004. He turned professional at the end of that year.

Having played in three tournaments on the European tour as an amateur in 2004, Heath joined the second tier Challenge Tour in 2005, and was moderately successful in his first season, finishing 23rd on the end of season rankings. Having failed to come through qualifying school at the end of the year, he was again playing on the second tier in 2006. He enjoyed even more success, winning his first professional title at the ECCO Tour Championship in Denmark on his way to 14th in the Challenge Tour Rankings and graduation to the European Tour for 2007.

Heath's rookie season on the European Tour was largely unsuccessful, although he did manage two top ten finishes in minor events, and he was back on the Challenge Tour in 2008.

Amateur wins (6)
1999 McGregor Trophy
2001 Golf Illustrated Gold Vase
2002 Greek Amateur Open Championship, Faldo Junior Series
2004 English Amateur, Lytham Trophy

Professional wins (3)

Challenge Tour wins (2)

1Co-sanctioned by the Nordic Golf League

PGA EuroPro Tour wins (1)

Team appearances
Amateur
Jacques Léglise Trophy (representing Great Britain & Ireland): 2001
European Youths' Team Championship (representing England): 2004
Bonallack Trophy (representing Europe): 2004
Eisenhower Trophy (representing England): 2004
St Andrews Trophy (representing Great Britain & Ireland): 2004 (winners)

See also
2006 Challenge Tour graduates
2013 European Tour Qualifying School graduates
2017 European Tour Qualifying School graduates

References

External links

English male golfers
European Tour golfers
Golfers from London
1983 births
Living people